The Eurovision Song Contest 1994 was the second time that Estonia had attempted to enter the contest, having failed to qualify from the semi-final stage of the Eurovision Song Contest 1993. The pre-selection process featured multiple artists for the first time, with Silvi Vrait's "Nagu merelaine" being selected by the judging panel to represent the nation in Ireland. In the contest, however, Vrait would place 24th second and last, receiving only two points in the scoring process and only beating fellow Baltic nation Lithuania.

Before Eurovision

Eurolaul 1994 
The final took place in Tallinn, Estonia on 26 February 1994, and was hosted by Reet Oja and Guido Kangur. Unlike the previous year, multiple artists entered the preselection show, with ten different songs featured. Pearu Paulus would perform two songs, with Evelin Samuel performing three. Paulus and Hedvig Hanson's "Kallim kullast" would ultimately be edged out narrowly by Silvi Vrait's "Nagu merelaine", with Vrait winning the competition and earning the right to represent Estonia in Dublin.

The jury panel that voted in the final consisted of Kare Kauks, Faime Jurno, Uno Loop, Lagle Mäll, Erik Morna, Toomas Vanem, Olav Osolin, Heidy Tamme, Helgi Erilaid, Lembit Ulfsak, Tarmo Kruusimäe, Maian Kärmas, Kaidi Klein, Peeter Vähi, Indrek Sei and Cathy Korju.

At Eurovision 
On the night of the final, Silvi Vrait performed 10th, following Switzerland and preceding Romania. At the end of the voting, Silvi have received 2 points, finishing 24th out of 25 competing countries.

Voting

References

1994
Countries in the Eurovision Song Contest 1994
Eurovision